The Women's 50m Freestyle at the 2007 World Aquatics Championships took place on 31 March (prelims & semifinals) and 1 April (finals) at Rod Laver Arena in Melbourne, Australia. A total of 143 swimmers were entered in the event; 138 swam the event.

The existing records at the start of the competition were:
World Record (WR): 24.13, Inge de Bruijn (Netherlands), 22 September 2000 in Sydney, Australia.
Championship Record (CR): 24.45, Inge de Bruijn (Netherlands), Fukuoka 2001 (Jul.28.2001).

Results

Final

Semifinals

Prelims

References

2007 Worlds results: Women's 50m free--Prelims from OmegaTiming.com (official timer of the 2007 World Championships); Retrieved 2009-07-08.
Worlds results: Women's 50m free--Semifinals from OmegaTiming.com (official timer of the 2007 World Championships); Retrieved 2009-07-08.
2007 Worlds results: Women's 50m free--Finals from OmegaTiming.com (official timer of the 2007 World Championships); Retrieved 2009-07-08.

Swimming at the 2007 World Aquatics Championships
2007 in women's swimming